was the 4th kumicho of the Yamaguchi-gumi, Japan's largest yakuza gang.

He took the role of kumicho (supreme Godfather) in 1984, but was assassinated at a girlfriend's home in Osaka early the next year by a rival faction, the Ichiwa-kai.  The killing sparked a massive yakuza war, the Yama-Ichi War, in which more than 20 people died.

Yamaguchi-gumi
Yakuza members
Japanese crime bosses
1933 births
1985 deaths
People from Himeji, Hyōgo
Murdered gangsters
Deaths by firearm in Japan